David John Daniell (17 February 1929 – 1 June 2016) was an English literary scholar who became Professor of English at University College London. He was founder of the Tyndale Society, a specialist in William Tyndale and his translations of the Bible, and author of a number of studies of the plays of Shakespeare.

Life
Daniell was the son of Rev Eric H Daniell (later minister at Grange Road Baptist Church, Darlington, 1941–1946) and his wife Betty, and was nephew to the mathematician Percy John Daniell. He was educated at Queen Elizabeth Grammar School in Darlington followed by St Catherine's College, Oxford, where he read English. He graduated with a Bachelor of Arts degree in 1952 (Master of Arts in 1954). Also in 1954 he was awarded a BA degree in Theology. He studied from 1954 to 1955 at the University of Tübingen, receiving a postgraduate degree. In 1972 he received his PhD from the University of London, in Shakespeare studies.

In 1979, Daniell accompanied the Royal Shakespeare Company on a six-week tour of European cities.

In 1980 and 1982 he published two volumes of The Best Short Stories of John Buchan; in 1989, William Tyndale's New Testament, and in 1992 William Tyndale's Old Testament.

In 1994 he published a biography of William Tyndale and the following year (January 1995) became founder and first chairman of the Tyndale Society following a meeting the British Library.

1998 he published the Arden Third Series edition of Shakespeare's Julius Caesar.  His book about the history of the English Bible (The Bible in English: History and Influence) appeared in 2003.

Daniell spent twelve years as a Sixth Form Master at Apsley Grammar School before moving to University College London where he was appointed a professor of English. He retired in 1994. 

He was an honorary fellow of Hertford College, Oxford and of St Catherine's College, Oxford, and also visiting fellow and honorary member of the Senior Common Room at Magdalen College, Oxford.

Family
Daniell married Dorothy Mary Wells in 1956 and they had two sons. His wife died on 25 November 2010.

Death
The Tyndale Society gives the date of his death as 1 June 2016. A brief notice was also posted by Hertford College, Oxford.

Selected works and edited books 

 .
 .
 .
 .
 .
 .
 .
 .
 .
 .
 .
 .
 .
 .
 .

See also 
William Tyndale
Tyndale Bible
English translations of the Bible
Luther Bible
Matthew Bible
King James Bible
William Shakespeare
John Buchan, 1st Baron Tweedsmuir

References

External links
 .
 .
 .
 .

1929 births
2016 deaths
English non-fiction writers
British translation scholars
Academics of University College London
English male non-fiction writers